Sister Miriam Therese Winter  (born Gloria Winter; 1938, Passaic, New Jersey) is a Roman Catholic Medical Mission Sister, theologian, writer and songwriter. Her hymns include "Joy Is Like the Rain" (1966), "Knock Knock" (1968), and "Wellspring of Wisdom" (1989). As a Medical Mission Sister, Winter has worked along the Thai-Cambodian border and in Ethiopia at refugee camps. Winter has also traveled to communities in Botswana, Ghana, Uganda and Kenya and India to spread her music as well as performing in the United States, Canada, Australia and New Zealand. 

"Joy Is Like the Rain" is primarily acoustic music. The recording was very popular amongst evangelicals in Britain. "Knock Knock" was similarly popular. It introduced two electric instruments: a guitar, a bass guitar and also added drums on some songs. 

Miriam Therese Winter earned her B.A. in music from Catholic University, her Master’s degree in religious education from McMaster Divinity College, and a Ph.D. in liturgical studies from Princeton Theological Seminary.  Winter also holds honorary doctorates from the University of Hartford, Mount Saint Vincent University and Albertus Magnus College. 

She currently teaches at Hartford Seminary (now Hartford International University for Religion and Peace) as Professor of Liturgy, Worship, Spirituality and Feminist Studies. Here, Winter founded the Women's Leadership Institute and teaches courses using ecumenical and cross-cultural emphases in theory and in practice, and developing feminist and multifaith approaches that have culminated in a quantum perspective.

Selected books
Paradoxology: Spirituality in a Quantum Universe (2009) Orbis Books
Out of the Depths: The Story of Ludmila Javorová, Ordained Roman Catholic Priest (2001) Crossroad
The Singer and the Song: An Autobiography of the Spirit (1999) Orbis Books
The Chronicles of Noah and Her Sisters: Genesis and Exodus According to Women (1995) Crossroad
Defecting in Place: Women Claiming Responsibility for Their Own Spiritual Lives (1994) Crossroad (Catholic Press Association Second Place Award for Books on Gender Studies in 1995)
The Gospel According to Mary: A New Testament for Women (1993) Crossroad

References

External links
 Sister Miriam Therese's homepage
 The Women-Church Movement, an essay by Winter
 Medical Mission Sisters

1938 births
20th-century American Roman Catholic theologians
Christian feminist theologians
Living people
Writers from Passaic, New Jersey
Songwriters from New Jersey
Women Christian theologians
Catholics from New Jersey
20th-century American Roman Catholic nuns
21st-century American Roman Catholic nuns